Cass Cave is a cave located in Cass, West Virginia, on Cheat Mountain. On March 16, 1968, 8 people were trapped and later rescued in the cave. In 1976, an amateur caver was trapped in the cave for more than 15 hours, falling 40 feet to the cave floor after an equipment malfunction.
In 1977, a climber was trapped in the waterfall and died of hypothermia due to being drenched by falling water.

Cass Cave has the highest subterranean waterfall in West Virginia and Virginia, Lacy Suicide Falls, with a height of 139 ft. This high waterfall was misnamed; a suicide did occur but it was at a small drop very near the entrance. The cave is not open to the general public.

One of the rooms in the cave (the "Big Room") is 800 ft long, 180 ft high and 75 ft wide.

The June 1964 Issue of National Geographic featured a two-page fold-out color photograph by Huntley Ingalls of a caver climbing a wire ladder adjacent to the waterfall. The photo was illuminated by a series of #2 Press photo flashbulbs laid over an aluminum foil reflector spread on the slope below..

See also
List of waterfalls of West Virginia

References

External links
 Cass Cave

Caves of West Virginia